One-liner may refer to:

 One-line joke
 One-liner program, textual input to the command-line of an operating system shell that performs some function in just one line of input
 Tagline, a variant of a branding slogan typically used in marketing materials and advertising
one-line haiku

See also
Aphorism